Florianópolis-Hercílio Luz International Airport , branded Floripa Airport, is the airport serving Florianópolis, Brazil. It is named after Hercílio Pedro da Luz (1860–1924), three times governor of the state of Santa Catarina and senator.

It is operated by Zurich Airport Brasil. 

Some of its facilities are shared with the Florianópolis Air Force Base of the Brazilian Air Force.

History
The airport was built on the site of an old Air Naval Base, which operated until 1941, when its jurisdiction changed to the Brazilian Air Force.

Between 1927 and 1932, the then known as Campeche Field was also used by the French aviators of the Compagnie Générale Aéropostale for its operations in Florianópolis. Among them were Jean Mermoz, Antoine de Saint-Exupéry and Henri Guillaumet.

Between 1942 and 1945 the runway 03/21, apron, control tower and passenger terminal were built. At the same time, some facilities of the Florianópolis Air Force Base were built and made operational.

In the period between 1952 and 1954 the passenger terminal was rebuilt and was operational until 1976 when a brand-new terminal building and apron were opened. The old facility is today the cargo terminal. The new terminal was further enlarged in 1988 and 2000, reaching the present 8,703 m2.

In 1978 the runway 14/32 was opened allowing a great increase in traffic. In 1995 the airport was upgraded to international category and started receiving particularly seasonal and charter flights from Argentina, Chile, Paraguay, and Uruguay.

On March 16, 2017, Flughafen Zürich AG was granted the concession to operate and expand the airport, owning 100% of it.

On January 15, 2018, the new concessionaire began construction of a new terminal with 14 new gates - 3 international and 11 domestic. The cost of the project was BRL 570 million. The new terminal, located on the opposite side of the main runway from the old one, was officially opened on September 28, 2019. Operations using the new terminal started on October 1, 2019.

Airlines and destinations

Cargo

Statistics

Accidents and incidents
22 March 1951: a Cruzeiro do Sul Douglas C-53D-DO plane, registration PP-CCX while landing at Florianópolis crashed following an overshoot in bad weather and an engine failure. Of the 14 passengers and crew, 3 died.
12 April 1980: a Transbrasil Boeing 727-27C operating flight 303 registration PT-TYS flying from São Paulo-Congonhas to Florianópolis while on a night instrumental approach to Florianópolis under a severe thunderstorm went off course, struck a hill and exploded. Probable causes are misjudgment of speed and distance, inadequate flight supervision, failure to initiate a go-around and improper operation of the engines. Of the 58 passengers and crew aboard, 3 passengers survived.

Access

See also

List of airports in Brazil
Florianópolis Air Force Base

References

External links

Airports in Santa Catarina (state)
Airports established in 1927
Economy of Florianópolis